Lausanne 2020 was a successful bid by the city of Lausanne and the Swiss Olympic Association to host the 2020 Winter Youth Olympics. The IOC selected the host city for the 2020 Winter Youth Olympics at the 128th IOC Session in Kuala Lumpur, Malaysia on July 31, 2015, which Lausanne won.

History

Applicant city phase

Lausanne's bid for the 2020 Winter Youth Olympics was confirmed on 12 July 2013. The city is where the International Olympic Committee is headquartered. Lausanne is also home to many sport federations. The bid was formally put forward in August 2013. Lausanne was signed Youth Olympic Game Candidature Procedure on 12 December 2013.

Previous bids

The city of Lausanne made several bids in the past. Lausanne bid to host the Summer Olympics in 1936 but lost to Berlin. The city again bid for the 1944 Summer Olympics which was awarded to London, however those games were cancelled because of the Second World War. London hosted the 1948 Summer Olympics. Lausanne bid to host the 1960 Summer Olympics but lost to Rome.

Previous bids by other Swiss cities

St. Moritz hosted the 1928 and 1948 Winter Olympics. St Moritz unsuccessfully bid to host the 1936 and 1960 Winter Olympics and lost to Garmisch-Partenkirchen and Squaw Valley respectively.

Sion bid to host the 1976, 2002 and 2006 Winter Olympics but lost to Denver, Salt Lake City and Turin respectively. Denver pulled out as host of the 1976 games and Innsbruck ultimately hosted the games.

Venues

Lausanne
 Palais de Beaulieu - Figure skating, short track, curling
 Stade Pierre de Coubertin - Opening and closing ceremonies, medal ceremonies
 UNIL-EPFL Sport Centre - Speed skating
 Centre intercommunal de glace de Malley - Hockey
 Lausanne campus - Olympic village

Jura
Prémanon, France - Ski jumping, Biathlon, Nordic Combined
Le Brassus - Cross-country Skiing

Alps
Leysin
Les Mosses
Les Diablerets
Villars-sur-Ollon

Notes and references

External links
 Official website

2020 Winter Youth Olympics bids
Sport in Lausanne
Switzerland at the Youth Olympics